Rufoclanis rosea is a moth of the family Sphingidae first described by Herbert Druce in 1882. It is known from forests in Burkina Faso, Ghana, Cameroon, Gabon, the Central African Republic, Tanzania and Uganda.

The length of the forewings is 30–32 mm for males. Females are larger, with more rounded wings. The forewings are very pale olive brown with distinct narrow dark transverse lines, a dark dot at the base and one near the tornus.

References

Rufoclanis
Moths described in 1882
Moths of Africa